State Road 684 (SR 684) is a state road located in Manatee County, Florida, United States. The road runs from an intersection with SR 789 in Bradenton Beach east to U.S. Route 41 (US 41) and unsigned SR 55 in South Bradenton. SR 684 is known as Cortez Road its entire length and varies from a two-lane road between Bradenton Beach and Cortez to a four- to six-lane road east of Cortez. The easternmost portion of SR 684 is concurrent with US 41 and is unsigned.

Route description
SR 684 begins at an intersection with SR 789 on the Gulf of Mexico in Bradenton Beach, heading east on two-lane undivided Cortez Road West. The road passes resort development before crossing Sarasota Pass on a drawbridge. At this point, the state road heads into Cortez and gains a center left-turn lane, passing residential development. SR 684 curves southeast and becomes a four-lane divided highway, passing through wooded areas with some trailer parks to the south, with the median turning into a center left-turn lane. The road heads to the east again and continues through residential areas. The state road gains a median again and continues between homes and businesses to the north and fields to the south. SR 684 heads into Bradenton and heads east through residential and commercial development as a four-lane divided highway. The road widens to six lanes as it continues through business areas and comes to an intersection with US 41/US 41 Bus./SR 45 in South Bradenton. At this intersection, US 41 heads south on unsigned SR 45 while US 41 Bus. heads north on unsigned SR 45. It is here that SR 684 signage ends and that US 41 turns east to form a concurrency with the unsigned SR 684, with US 41/SR 684 continuing east on Cortez Road West. The road passes through more commercial areas, heading to the south of the DeSoto Square shopping mall. After passing the mall, US 41 curves north to follow unsigned SR 55 on 1st Street, while SR 684 briefly follows 44th Street East eastbound and 44th Street Connector westbound before ending. The road continues east as locally-maintained 44th Avenue East.

Major intersections

References

684
684